HMS Cossack was a Tribal-class destroyer of the Royal Navy launched in 1907 and sold in 1919.

Construction and design
HMS Cossack was one of five Tribal-class destroyers ordered as part of the 1905–06 shipbuilding programme. Cammell Laird's design was powered by steam turbines rated at  fed by five boilers to drive three propeller shafts, and had three large funnels. Armament was the specified three 12 pounder (3 inch, 76 mm) 12 cwt guns, two side by side on the ship's forecastle and one aft, with two 18 in (450 mm) torpedo tubes.

Cossack was laid down on 13 November 1905 and launched on 16 February 1907.

Service
Shortly after Cossack entered service, it was decided to strengthen the armament of the first batch of Tribals by adding another two 12 pounder guns, this being done in 1909. Cossack was considered by her Captain to be a poorer sea boat than River-class destroyers, but a better gun platform.

In 1909, following a re-organisation of the Royal Navy's Home and Atlantic Fleets, Cossack was part of the First Destroyer Flotilla of the Home Fleet.  1910, Cossack remained part of the First Flotilla in 1910. By 1913, she had joined the 4th Destroyer Flotilla, based at Portsmouth. In October that year, the Tribals were officially designated the F class, and as such the letter "F" was painted on Cossacks bows. While still a part of the 4th Flotilla in January 1914, but by February had transferred to the 6th Destroyer Flotilla.

During the First World War she served in the North Sea and the English Channel with the 6th Destroyer Flotilla.

On 23 August 1914, Cossack was involved in a collision with her sister Tribal-class destroyer, Ghurka. In October 1914, Cossack was one of a number of warships of the Dover Patrol that were deployed to help support Belgian ground forces during the Battle of the Yser, with all available ships being used to carry out shore bombardment operations. At one stage, on 20 October 1914, after the destroyer Amazon was damaged by German shellfire, Rear Admiral Horace Hood transferred his flag to Cossack.

On the night of 26/27 October 1916, German torpedo boats of their Flanders Flotilla carried out a large scale raid into the English Channel, hoping to attack the drifters watching the anti-submarine nets of the Dover Barrage, and to sink Allied shipping in the Channel. Cossack was one of six Tribal-class destroyers waiting at readiness in Dover harbour, and when the Germans attacked the drifters and sank the supporting destroyer , they were ordered to intervene.

On 1 July 1917, Cossack collided with the transport SS The Duchess near Eastbourne. Cossacks depth charges exploded as a result of the collision, sinking The Duchess and blowing off Cossacks stern. Cossack  was towed to Dover for repair.

On 16 September 1918, a fire started in one of the magazines of the newly delivered monitor HMS Glatton. In order to prevent an explosion that could affect a nearby ammunition ship, it was decided to sink Glatton. Cossack fired two torpedoes at Glatton, one of which failed to detonate, while the second failed to defeat Glattons anti-torpedo bulge. In the end, Glatton was sunk by 21 inch (533 mm) torpedoes from the destroyer HMS Myngs.

Cossack was sold to the shipbreakers Thos. W. Ward on 12 December 1919 for scrapping at their Preston, Lancashire, works.

Pennant numbers

Notes

Citations

Bibliography

External links
 HMS Cossack , Index of 19th Century Naval Vessels

 

Tribal-class destroyers (1905)
Ships built on the River Mersey
1907 ships
World War I destroyers of the United Kingdom